Daila Dameno (born 18 June 1968) is an Italian Paralympic alpine skier. She represented Italy in Paralympic swimming at the Athens 2004 Summer Paralympics and in 2006  Winter Paralympics. She won two medals: a silver in the special slalom and a bronze in the giant slalom.

Life 
She became paraplegic following a domestic accident. She has a degree in accounting, she resides in Inveruno .

Paralympics 
Dameno competed at the 2004 Summer Paralympics, in the Women's 50 metre freestyle S5, Women's 50 metre butterfly S5, Women's 100 metre freestyle S5, Women's 200 metre freestyle S5.

She also competed in alpine skiing, at the 2006 Winter Paralympics, where in the sitting slalom race she won the silver medal. She won a bronze medal in the giant slalom race, and competed in the Women's Super-G and Women's combined.

References

External links 

 Daila Dameno of Italy in the Womens Alpine Skiing Giant Slalom Sitting competition George Blonsky / Alamy Stock Photo, 2006

1968 births
Living people
Paralympic swimmers of Italy
Paralympic alpine skiers of Italy
Italian female alpine skiers
Italian female freestyle swimmers
Italian female butterfly swimmers
Swimmers at the 2004 Summer Paralympics
Alpine skiers at the 2006 Winter Paralympics
Alpine skiers at the 2010 Winter Paralympics
Medalists at the 2006 Winter Paralympics
Paralympic silver medalists for Italy
Paralympic bronze medalists for Italy
21st-century Italian women